The following is a list of notable individuals who were born in and/or have lived in McLean, Virginia.

Arts and entertainment
Mary Schmidt Amons, cast member on Bravo's The Real Housewives of DC
Michael Arndt, Academy Award-winning screenwriter
Kathryn Erskine, National Book Award-winning children's author
James Tiptree Jr., pen name of Alice Sheldon, science fiction author
Gore Vidal, author and political activist

Business
Steve Case, co-founder and former chief executive officer and chairman of America Online
William E. Conway Jr., founder of the Carlyle Group
Richard Darman, senior Carlyle Group affiliate
Richard Fairbank, CEO, chairman, co-founder of Capital One
Najeeb Halaby, CEO of Pan Am, administrator of the Federal Aviation Administration, and father of Queen Noor of Jordan 
Jim Kimsey, co-founder, CEO, and first chairman of America Online
Ted Leonsis, owner of the Washington Capitals and Washington Wizards, former AOL senior executive
Daniel Mudd, former CEO of Fortress Investment Group and former president of Fannie Mae
Dwight Schar, founder and chairman of NVR Inc, America's seventh-largest homebuilder
Stu Shea, COO of Leidos and founder and chairman of United States Geospatial Intelligence Foundation

Journalism
Sharyn Alfonsi, correspondent for ABC World News, Good Morning America and Nightline
Sam Donaldson, former ABC News anchor and Chief White House Correspondent
Jonathan Karl, TV and print journalism for ABC News (originally from McLean, later in South Dakota and Poughkeepsie, New York)
Roger Mudd, Emmy Award-winning journalist, television host and former CBS, NBC and PBS news anchor
Lauren Shehadi, sportscaster for MLB Network and Turner Sports
Derek Thompson, staff writer for The Atlantic

Military
Arnold W. Braswell, retired lieutenant general of the United States Air Force
 Frederic J. Brown II, U.S. Army lieutenant general
 Frederic J. Brown III, U.S. Army lieutenant general
 Major General John V. Cox, Marine Corps fighter pilot and Naval Aviator
General Colin Powell, former Secretary of State
Vice Admiral Forrest S Petersen USN, Naval Aviator and X15 pilot

Politics

Spencer Abraham, 10th Secretary of Energy and Republican United States senator from Michigan (1995–2001)
Elliott Abrams, Special Assistant to Former President Bush
Prince Turki bin Faisal Al Saud, former Saudi Ambassador to the United States
Joe Allbaugh, campaign manager for George W. Bush
Bandar bin Sultan, former Saudi Ambassador to the United States
Jacqueline Bouvier, wife of John F. Kennedy
Pat Buchanan, political analyst.
Zbigniew Brzezinski, National Security Advisor to Jimmy Carter
Frank Carlucci, former Secretary of Defense, former chairman of the Carlyle Group
Dick Cheney, former Vice President of the United States
Elizabeth Cheney, daughter of former Vice President Dick Cheney and Lynne Cheney
Lynne Cheney, former Second Lady of the United States
John Dingell, Dean of the United States House of Representatives
Senator Byron Dorgan
Newt Gingrich, former Speaker of the House
Chuck Hagel, United States Secretary of Defense
Jon Huntsman Jr., former Governor of Utah and presidential candidate
Frank Keating, former Governor of Oklahoma
Supreme Court Justice Anthony Kennedy
Ethel Kennedy
Ted Kennedy, senior United States senator from Massachusetts
Bill Kristol, political analyst
Laura Ingraham, Fox News host and conservative political commentator
Patrick Leahy, United States senator from Vermont
Mike Lee, junior United States senator from Utah
I. Lewis "Scooter" Libby, lawyer, and former chief of staff to Vice President Dick Cheney (2001–2005)
Fred Malek, former assistant to United States presidents George H.W. Bush and Richard Nixon
Terry McAuliffe, Governor of Virginia and former chairman of the Democratic National Committee
Luke Messer, member of the United States House of Representatives
Don Nickles, former Republican Senator from Oklahoma
Queen Noor of Jordan
Liam O'Grady, United States District Court Judge
Chuck Robb, former United States senator and governor of Virginia
Mark Rosenker, former Chairman of the National Transportation Safety Board and Major General USAF (ret)
Supreme Court Justice Antonin Scalia
Amha Selassie, last Emperor of Ethiopia
John E. Sununu, former United States senator from New Hampshire
Nicholas Veliotes, former United States Ambassador to Egypt and Jordan
Jean Zermatten, chairman of the U.N. Committee on the Rights of the Child; son of famous Swiss writer Maurice Zermatten

Science
Vint Cerf, computer scientist, internet pioneer, considered one of ""the fathers of the Internet""
Herman Aguinis, Professor at the George Washington University School of Business, and Past President of the Academy of Management

Sports
Bradley Beal, shooting guard for the Washington Wizards
Eric Dorsey, former defensive end for the New York Giants; attended high school in McLean
Kevin Hogan, quarterback for the Washington Redskins
Alexander Ovechkin, captain of the Washington Capitals
Josh Sborz, pitcher for the Los Angeles Dodgers organization
Max Scherzer, pitcher for the Washington Nationals organization
TJ Oshie, right winger for the Washington Capitals

References

McLean, Virginia
McLean